Believe in Me is the fifth studio album by American singer  Regina Belle. It was released by MCA Records on June 9, 1998 in the United States. Belle's debut and sole release with MCA, she worked with producer and songwriter Erik "E-Smooth" Hicks on the majority of the album. Believe in Me received generally positiv reviews  but became her lowest-charting album yet, peaking at number 42 on the US Top R&B/Hip-Hop Albums. It earned a Grammy Award nomination for Best Traditional R&B Vocal Album in 1999, and produced the singles, "I've Had Enough" and "Don't Let Go."

Critical reception

Allmusic editor John Jones called Believe in Me Belle's "strongest release" yet. He found that "Belle manages to utilize slick, hip production and update her sound without forgetting the most important element: strong hooks and well-written tunes. Eric "E-Smooth" Hicks provides the production backdrop for eight of the album's tracks, giving Belle the strongest rhythmic push her music has ever had [...] Even a couple of less interesting pop tunes aren't enough to weigh this project down. Filled with memorable hooks and irresistible grooves, Believe in Me finds Regina Belle at the top of her game."

Track listing

Notes
  denotes a co-producer

Charts

References 

Regina Belle albums
1998 albums
MCA Records albums